Alfred Musgrave Merriweather OBE, CBE (19 August 1918 – 8 October 1999) was a Scottish missionary in Botswana, who was a member of the National Assembly of Botswana and its first Speaker. He helped improve public health in Botswana.

Biography
Merriweather was born in Yorkshire, and lived later in Glasgow.

He moved to Molepolole in Bechuanaland Protectorate in 1944 to work in the Scottish Livingstone Hospital. His medical reputation allowed him to become medical adviser to the Seretse Khama, first President of Botswana. Merriweather was elected as the speaker of the Legislative Assembly, and as the first speaker of the National Assembly when Botswana became independent.

He gained a PhD in Medicine from the University of Edinburgh in 1956.

He died in Molepolole in 1999.

References

Medical doctors from Yorkshire
Scottish Christian missionaries
British emigrants to Botswana
British Army personnel of World War II
Speakers of the National Assembly (Botswana)
Botswana physicians
1918 births
1999 deaths
Christian missionaries in Botswana
20th-century British medical doctors
White Botswana people